Sphingomonas endophytica  is a Gram-negative bacteria from the genus of Sphingomonas which has been isolated from the root of the plant Artemisia annua in the Yunnan province in China.

References

Further reading

External links
Type strain of Sphingomonas endophytica at BacDive -  the Bacterial Diversity Metadatabase	

endophytica
Bacteria described in 2012